is a stony near-Earth asteroid of the Atira class residing within Earth's orbit. It was discovered on 18 February 2015 by the Pan-STARRS 1 survey at Haleakalā Observatory at Maui, Hawaiʻi. On 11 March 2022, it made a close approach  from Earth, reaching a peak apparent magnitude of 17 as it streaked across the southern sky.

Discovery 
 was discovered on 18 February 2015 by the Pan-STARRS 1 survey at Haleakalā Observatory at Maui, Hawaiʻi. It was first observed at apparent magnitude 20.7, located in the southern sky 28 degrees below the ecliptic with an angular separation (solar elongation) of 76 degrees from the Sun. Follow-up observations from the Mauna Kea Observatory and Cerro Tololo Inter-American Observatory commenced, establishing an observation arc of 12 days until its discovery announcement by the Minor Planet Center on 2 March 2015.

On 5 March 2016,  was recovered by the ESA Optical Ground Station at apparent magnitude 19, at solar elongations below 56 degrees. It was observed to be about 0.5 degrees away from its predicted positions in March 2016. The recovery observations significantly reduced the asteroid's orbital uncertainty, bringing its uncertainty parameter down from 9 to 3.

,  has been observed for over 7 years, with a well-determined orbit at an uncertainty parameter of 0.

Classification 
 is one of a small number of Atira class asteroids that are orbiting entirely within the Earth's orbit.

References

External links 
 
 
 

Minor planet object articles (unnumbered)

20220311
20150218